A tetrahedral number, or triangular pyramidal number, is a figurate number that represents a pyramid with a triangular base and three sides, called a tetrahedron. The th tetrahedral number, is the sum of the first  triangular numbers, that is,

The tetrahedral numbers are:

1, 4, 10, 20, 35, 56, 84, 120, 165, 220, ...

Formula 

The formula for the th tetrahedral number is represented by the 3rd rising factorial of  divided by the factorial of 3:

The tetrahedral numbers can also be represented as binomial coefficients:

Tetrahedral numbers can therefore be found in the fourth position either from left or right in Pascal's triangle.

Proofs of formula
This proof uses the fact that the th triangular number is given by

It proceeds by induction.

Base case

Inductive step

The formula can also be proved by Gosper's algorithm.

Generalization

The pattern found for triangular numbers  and for tetrahedral numbers  can be generalized. This leads to the formula:

Geometric interpretation 

Tetrahedral numbers can be modelled by stacking spheres. For example, the fifth tetrahedral number can be modelled with 35 billiard balls and the standard triangular billiards ball frame that holds 15 balls in place. Then 10 more balls are stacked on top of those, then another 6, then another three and one ball at the top completes the tetrahedron.

Tetrahedral roots and tests for tetrahedral numbers

which follows  from Cardano's formula.

Properties 
, the square pyramidal numbers.
, sum of odd squares.
, sum of even squares.
A. J. Meyl proved in 1878 that only three tetrahedral numbers are also perfect squares, namely:

.
Sir Frederick Pollock conjectured that every number is the sum of at most 5 tetrahedral numbers: see Pollock tetrahedral numbers conjecture.
 The only tetrahedral number that is also a square pyramidal number is 1 (Beukers, 1988), and the only tetrahedral number that is also a perfect cube is 1.

 The parity of tetrahedral numbers follows the repeating pattern odd-even-even-even.
An observation of tetrahedral numbers:

Numbers that are both triangular and tetrahedral must satisfy the binomial coefficient equation:

 The only numbers that are both tetrahedral and triangular numbers are :
 
 
 
 
 
 is the sum of all products p × q where (p, q) are ordered pairs and p + q = n + 1
 is the number of (n + 2)-bit numbers that contain two runs of 1's in their binary expansion.

Popular culture

 is the total number of gifts "my true love sent to me" during the course of all 12 verses of the carol, "The Twelve Days of Christmas". The cumulative total number of gifts after each verse is also  for verse n.

The number of possible KeyForge three-house combinations is also a tetrahedral number,  where  is the number of houses.

See also
 Centered triangular number

References

External links
 
 Geometric Proof of the Tetrahedral Number Formula by Jim Delany, The Wolfram Demonstrations Project.

Figurate numbers
Simplex numbers